Roelf Johannes (Roel) Wieringa (born 1952) is a Dutch computer scientist who was a Professor of Information Systems at the University of Twente, specialized in the "integration of formal and informal specification and design techniques".

Biography 
Wieringa received his MA in 1987 at the Vrije Universiteit Amsterdam, Faculty of Mathematics and Computer Science for the thesis Machine intelligence and explication, and his PhD in 1990  under supervision of Reinder Pieter van de Riet for the thesis Algebraic Foundations for Dynamic Conceptual Models.

Early 1990s he continued to work at the Faculty of Mathematics and Computer Science of the Vrije Universiteit. In 1998 he joined the Department of Computer Science of the University of Twente as Professor of Information Systems. From 2006 to 2011 he was Scientific Director of the School of Information and Knowledge Systems (SIKS), and from 2009 to 2012 he headed the computer science department at the University of Twente.

Circa 1996, Wieringa and Frank Dehne wrote the Toolkit for Conceptual Modeling, for Wieringa's conceptual modeling courses and book, Requirements Engineering: Frameworks for Understanding.

Wieringa has been Associate Editor in Chief of the IEEE Software journal from 2004 to 2007, and is member of the editorial board of the International Journal of Business Information Systems, the Journal of Software and Systems Modeling, and the Requirements Engineering Journal.

In 2019, Wieringa retired from academia, and now works and blogs at The Value Engineers, which was founded in 2017 with Jaap Gordijn and Dan Ionita.

The engineering cycle 
Main article: Engineering cycle

The engineering cycle is a framework used in Design Science for Information Systems and Software Engineering, proposed by Roel Wieringa in his book "Design Science Methodology for Information Systems and Software Engineering". 

The engineering cycle consists of:

 Problem investigation.
 Treatment design.
 Treatment validation.
 Treatment implementation.
 Implementation evaluation.

The design cycle consists of the first 3 tasks of the engineering cycle: investigation, design, and validation.

The engineering and design cycles do not prescribe a mandatory, rigid sequence of activities. Moreover, they are often applied recursively for sub-problems of the main research objective.

The engineering cycle and the design cycle are often applied in several iterations (hence “cycle”). In such a case, the evaluation may become the investigation part of the next engineering cycle.

Validation vs. evaluation in the engineering cycle 
According to the Design science methodology of (Wieringa, 2014), validation is part of the design cycle. It involves checking if the designed artifacts support the initial assumptions. It is executed in a theoretical, “laboratory” environment; such as through discussions and interviews with practitioners and experts. Validation is executed before the implementation in practice. 

On the other hand, evaluation is executed after the implementation in practice of the designs. It involves analyzing the behavior, effects, and impact of the designed artifacts in practice, in the field. In our case, this meant implementation and analysis of the designs in actual, industry IT projects. 

Stefan Morcov proposes a parallel between these 2 activities and a similar framework, the Technology Readiness Level (TRL) model. The TRL model was proposed by NASA and is currently also widely applied in the European Union's research programs such as Horizon. Thus, validation leads to TRL level 4 - “Technology validated in a laboratory environment”; while evaluation leads to a TRL level 6 - “Technology demonstrated in a relevant environment”.

Publications 
Books, a selection
 1990. Algebraic Foundations for Dynamic Conceptual Models PhD thesis Vrije Universiteit Amsterdam.
 1996. Requirements Engineering: Frameworks for Understanding Wiley 
 1998. The role of deontic logic in the specification of information systems. With J-J. Meyer, and Frank PM Dignum. Springer US.
 2003. Design methods for reactive systems: Yourdon, Statemate, and the UML. Elsevier.
 2008.  Competences of IT Architects. With Erik Proper, Pascal van Eck and Claudia Steghuis. The Hague : Academic Service
2014. Design Science Methodology for Information Systems and Software Engineering. Springer.

Articles, a selection:
 1991. "The identification of objects and roles-object identifiers revisited." With Wiebren de Jonge.
 2003. "Aligning application architecture to the business context." With others in: Advanced Information Systems Engineering. Springer Berlin Heidelberg, 2003.
 2006. "Enterprise architecture: Management tool and blueprint for the organisation." With Henk Jonkers. Marc Lankhorst et al. in:Information Systems Frontiers  8.2 (2006): 63-66.

References

External links 
 Homepage at cs.utwente.nl
 The Value Engineers homepage

1952 births
Living people
Dutch computer scientists
Vrije Universiteit Amsterdam alumni
Academic staff of Vrije Universiteit Amsterdam
Academic staff of the University of Twente